Holy Trinity Richmond is an Anglican parish church in Sheen Park, Richmond, London.

History
The church, an example of Gothic Revival architecture, was built in 1870; the architect was Raphael Brandon.  A tower by Charles Lock Luck (1833/34–90), dating from 1880, was removed in about 1970 for safety reasons.

A 1950s-vintage meeting room complex south-east of the church was replaced in 1992.

Services and activities
The church holds services, with songs and modern music, on Sunday mornings and evenings. Programmes for children and teenagers are also offered.

A midweek service is held on Wednesday mornings.

The Crossing, the church's group for 14 to 18-year-olds, meets on Wednesday evenings during term time.  The Bridge, a club for young people in school years 7 and 8, is run fortnightly on Friday evenings during term time. Glow, a club for children in school years 4, 5, and 6, is run monthly on Friday evenings during term time. Age-related children's groups are also held on Sunday mornings.

A weekly women's group, Oasis, meets on Friday mornings.

References

1870 establishments in England
Richmond
Richmond
Gothic Revival church buildings in London
Raphael Brandon church buildings
Richmond, London